General Sweeney may refer to:

Charles Sweeney (1919–2004), U.S. Army Air Forces major general
Joseph Sweeney (Irish politician) (1897–1980), Irish National Army general
Walter C. Sweeney Sr. (1876–1963), U.S. Army major general 
Walter C. Sweeney Jr. (1909–1965), U.S. Air Force four-star general

See also
Thomas William Sweeny (1820–1892), Union Army brigadier general
Joseph Henry Sweney (1845–1918), Iowa National Guard brigadier general